The Sky Science PowerHawk is a British powered parachute that was designed and produced by Sky Science Powered Parachutes Limited of Tidworth. Now out of production, when it was available the aircraft was supplied as a kit for amateur construction.

The aircraft was introduced in about 2000 and production ended when the company went out of business at the end of 2003.

Design and development
The PowerHawk was designed to comply with the Fédération Aéronautique Internationale microlight category, as well as amateur-built aircraft rules. It features a  parachute-style wing, two-seats-in-tandem accommodation, tricycle landing gear or quadracycle  landing gear and a single  2si 690-L70 engine in pusher configuration.

The aircraft carriage is built from metal tubing with an optional full cockpit fairing. In flight steering is accomplished via foot pedals that actuate the canopy brakes, creating roll and yaw. On the ground the aircraft has lever-controlled nosewheel steering. The main landing gear incorporates spring rod suspension. On snow the aircraft uses four skis, two steerable ones in the front and two replacing the rear wheels.

The manufacturer estimated the construction time from the supplied kit as 30–50 hours.

Operational history
In August 2015 no examples were registered in the United Kingdom with the Civil Aviation Authority, although one had been registered in 2000 and de-registered by the CAA in 2005.

Specifications (PowerHawk)

References

External links
Company website archives on Archive.org

PowerHawk
2000s British sport aircraft
2000s British ultralight aircraft
Single-engined pusher aircraft
Powered parachutes